Dust Racing 2D (dustrac) is an open-source, tile-based 2D racing game developed by Jussi Lind. The source code is licensed under GNU GPLv3.

Gameplay 
The purpose of the game is to race against eleven challenging computer players on different race tracks. Finishing in TOP 6 will unlock a new race track. Only a small portion of the race track is visible on the scrolling screen. There's also an option for a split-screen two player game. Dust Racing 2D comes with a level editor that makes creating new race tracks easy.

History 
Dust Racing 2D was inspired by Super Cars and :fi:Slicks ’n’ Slide. The game was built by Jussi Lind on Qt development framework and it uses OpenGL for graphics. Due to the source code availability it is possible to port the game to multiple operating systems. The first version of the game was published in 2012. The game is under continued development as of August 2017.

Reception 
Dust Racing 2D was reviewed by Softpedia as being "All in all, Dust Racing 2D proved to be a fun video game, especially for nostalgics who want to relive their childhood." with 4 of 5 points.

Gallery

References

External links 

 The project home
 Releases

Linux games
Windows games
Open-source video games
Software that uses Qt
Top-down racing video games
Video games developed in Finland
2012 video games